La Guardia is a town of 50,000 inhabitants in the Santa Cruz Department of Bolivia. It is the 16th most populous town in the country, and is the fastest growing town in Bolivia.

External links
 Municipio La Guardia - Detailkarte und Bevölkerungsdaten (PDF; 756 kB)

Populated places in Santa Cruz Department (Bolivia)